The Secretary General of the Bangladesh Nationalist Party is the executive officer of the Nationalist Party, a political organization in Bangladesh. The Secretary General has direct control over all departments in the party. The Secretary General also serves as an advisor to all departments when not directly making decisions. The Secretary General has holistic view over a wide range of issues, ranging from staff appointments to dismissal and approval of the Party's executive branch members. The Secretary General is also responsible for verifying documents, including election expenditures, and delegating functions among the party's organisational editors in consultation with the party chairman.

List of general secretaries

References 

 
Bangladesh Nationalist Party
 
1978 establishments in Bangladesh